Belz is a commune in the Morbihan département in Brittany in northwestern France.

Population
Inhabitants of Belz are called Belzois.

See also
Communes of the Morbihan department
Élie Le Goff Article on the sculptor of Belz war memorial

References
 Mayors of Morbihan Association

External links

 The official website of the city hall 
  
  

Communes of Morbihan